Okus Quarry is a 2,500 square metre geological Site of Special Scientific Interest in Old Town, Swindon, Wiltshire, notified in 1951.

The site was formerly notified under the name "Okus Quarries".

Sources

 Natural England citation sheet for the site (accessed 7 April 2022)

External links
 Natural England website (SSSI information)

Sites of Special Scientific Interest in Wiltshire
Sites of Special Scientific Interest notified in 1951
Quarries in Wiltshire
Swindon